Below are the results for the 2015 World Series of Poker Europe, held from October 8-24 at the Spielbank Casino in Berlin, Germany.

Key

Results
Source:

Event 1: €2,200 Six Handed No Limit Hold'em
3-Day Event: October 8-10
Number of buy-ins: 197
Total Prize Pool: €382,180
Number of Payouts: 21
Winning Hand:

Event 2: €550 The Oktoberfest No Limit Hold'em
5-Day Event: October 9-13
Number of buy-ins: 2,144
Total Prize Pool: €1,039,840
Number of Payouts: 173
Winning Hand:

Event 3: €3,250 Eight Handed Pot Limit Omaha
3-Day Event: October 11-13
Number of buy-ins: 161
Total Prize Pool: €468,510
Number of Payouts: 20
Winning Hand:

Event 4: €1,650 Monster Stack No Limit Hold'em
3-Day Event: October 12-14
Number of buy-ins: 580
Total Prize Pool: €843,900
Number of Payouts: 63
Winning Hand:

Event 5: €2,200 Mixed Event
3-Day Event: October 13-15
Number of buy-ins: 113
Total Prize Pool: €219,220
Number of Payouts: 12
Winning Hand:  (Pot Limit Omaha)

Event 6: €3,250 No Limit Hold'em
3-Day Event: October 14-16
Number of buy-ins: 256
Total Prize Pool: €744,960
Number of Payouts: 27
Winning Hand:

Event 7: €550 Pot Limit Omaha
3-Day Event: October 15-17
Number of buy-ins: 503
Total Prize Pool: €243,955
Number of Payouts: 56
Winning Hand:

Event 8: €1,100 Turbo No Limit Hold'em Re-Entry
3-Day Event: October 16-18
Number of buy-ins: 546
Total Prize Pool: €546,000
Number of Payouts: 46
Winning Hand:

Event 9: €10,450 No Limit Hold'em Main Event
7-Day Event: October 18-24
Number of buy-ins: 313
Total Prize Pool: €3,067,400
Number of Payouts: 32
Winning Hand:

Event 10: €25,600 High Roller No Limit Hold'em
3-Day Event: October 21-23
Number of buy-ins: 64
Total Prize Pool: €1,584,000
Number of Payouts: 7
Winning Hand:

References

World Series of Poker Europe
World Series of Poker Europe Results, 2015